Satna is a city in the Indian state of Madhya Pradesh. It serves as the headquarters of Satna district. It is 7th largest city and 8th most populous city of the state. The city is 500 km east of the state capital Bhopal. The city is distributed over a land area of 111.9 square kilometres.

Satna has been selected as one of the hundred Indian cities to be developed as a smart city under PM Narendra Modi's flagship Smart Cities Mission.

History

From antiquity to the mutiny of 1857
At nearby Bharhut are the remains of a 2nd-century BC Buddhist stupa, first discovered in 1873 by the archaeologist Alexander Cunningham; most of the finds from this site were sent to the Indian Museum.

The Mahabharata associates this site with rulers of the Haihaya, Kalchuri or Chedi clans.

The chiefs of Rewa, descended from Baghel Rajput kings (who were, in turn, descended from the Solanki Rajputs), ruled over Gujarat in the thirteenth century. Vyaghra Deo, brother of the ruler of Gujarat, is said to have made his way into northern India about the middle of the thirteenth century and obtained the fort of Marpha, 18 miles north-east of Kalinjar. Bandhavgarh (now in the tehsil of the same name in Umaria district), which, until its conquest in 1562 by Akbar the Great, was the Baghel capital. In 1298, general prince Ulugh Khan, acting under order of his brother Sultan Alauddin Khalji, drove the last Baghel ruler of Gujrat out of his country. This is believed to have caused a considerable migration of the Baghels to Bandhavgarh.

From then until the 15th century, the Baghels of Bandhavgarh were engaged in extending their possessions and so they escaped the attention of the Delhi Sultans. In 1498–99, Sikandar Lodi failed in his attempt to take the fort of Bandhavgarh.

The Baghel King Ramchandra (1555–92) was a contemporary of padshah (emperor) Akbar the Great. Tansen, the great musician, was in the court of Ramchandra and from there Akbar summoned him to his Mughal court. After the death of Birdhabra, Ramchandra's son Vikramaditya acceded to the Rajput throne of Bandhogarh as a minor Raja, giving rise to civic disturbances. Akbar's generals intervened, capturing and dismantling the Bandhogarh fort in 1562. From then, the town of Rewa, along with the Sultanate of Malwa were became a part of the Great Mughal Empire.

Following the Treaty of Bassein (1802), the British made overtures of alliance to the ruler of Rewa, but the latter rejected them. In 1812, during the time of Raja Jaisingh (1809–35), a body of Pindaris raided Mirzapur from Rewa territory. As a result, Jaisingh was called upon to accede to a treaty, in which he acknowledged the protection of the British Government, and agreed to refer all disputes with neighboring chiefs to their arbitration and to allow British troops to march through, or be cantoned within, his territories.

During the mutiny of 1857, Maharaja Raghuraj Singh helped the British in quelling the uprisings in the neighboring Mandla and Jabalpur district, and in Nagod which is now a part of Satna district. For his part the king was rewarded by restoration of the Sohagpur (Shahdol) and Amarkantak parganas, which had been seized by the Marathas in the beginning of the century.
Rewa was entitled as a Maharaja"His Highness" and salute of 17 guns.

Princely states

Baroundha state 
Baroundha state belongs to "Raghuvanshi" "clan"of Rajputs the most prestigious clan amongst Rajputs according to Hindu literature(Ramayan). Baroundha was the most antiquated state of "Bundelkhand & Baghelkhand" regency, it was established in 1169, Under the ages of "Chendela Era"
The Ruler of Baroundha state was Raghubar Dayal Shah received the title at Imperial Assemblage of (Raja Bahadur) 
["HIS HIGHNESS"]
[His Highness & 9 guns salute]
It was a saluted state.
On 1 January 1877. Ruled family belongs to (Raghuvanshi) division of Rajputs. The Ruler was entitled to be received at a private (Durbar) by the (His Excellency the Viceroy). The founder was Maharaja Budhraj Shah of Baroundha in 1169. Noteworthy, he was a son-in-law of Parimardi Dev who was a famous ruler of "Kalinjar" belongs to Chendela Dynasty and his daughter Chandravati married Budhraj shah in 1169. Parimardi Dev gifted the northern part of his kingdom to Budhraj Shah in 1169, and the demarcation was East-Chitrakoot Ganga Pesuni river to West-bank of Bagay river and North bank of Yamuna river in Rajapur to Majhgawan. In 1169, Budhraj Shah declared his capital was "Rasin" (Rajvasni) near modern" "Karwi" Fort of "Marpha" and Rajapur latterly famous as a birthplace of Goswami Tulsidas. Budhraj Shah was very brave, eligible and illustrious ruler. Parimardi Dev was entitled him as "Navrang Shah". Baroundha was a solitary state of Raghuvanshi Rajputs from central India. which belongs to Solar dynasty and one of the most ancient dynasty which was founded in earlier texts, including the Vedas. The Ramayan and Srimatbhagwat, Raghavanshi is a main branch of the Suryavanshi Rajput clans of India who ruled, number of kingdoms and princely states. It was a princely state and the last ruler was H.H Maharaja Ram Pratap Singh his coronation held on 1933 and he died on 1983. His son took entitled Maharaja Anand Pratap Singh Judeo he died on 2013. At present Maharaja Ragvendra Pratap Singh judeo coronation held on 2013 and his son is Yuvraj Prathu Pratap Singh judeo and Maharajkumar 
Punya Pratap Singh.

Nagod state

Until the 18th century, the state was known as Unchahara from the name of its original capital. The chiefs of Nagod were Parihar, Rajputs belonging traditionally to Mount Abu.

In the seventh century, Parihar Rajputs drove out the Gaharwar rulers and established themselves in the country between Mahoba and Mau. In the ninth century, they were repulsed eastwards by the Chandels, where Raja Dhara Singh seized the fort of Naro from the Teli Rajas in 1344. In 1478 Raja Bhoj obtained Unchahara, which he made the chief town. It remained so until 1720, when the capital was moved to Nagod by Raja Chainsingh. Later, the Parihars lost all their territories to the Baghels and Bundelas except the limited territory that they held before 1947.

Following the treaty of Bassein in 1820, Nagod was held to be a tributary to Panna and was included in the sanad granted to that state in 1807. In 1809, however, a separate sanad was granted to Lal Sheshraj Singh confirming him in his possessions.

For his loyalty during the 1857 mutiny, Chief Raghvendra Singh was rewarded by the British who granted him eleven villages, which had formerly belonged to the confiscated state of Bijeraghogarh.

Nagod chiefs had the title of Raja and received a 9 gun salute.

Maihar state

Maihar State was a princely state in India during the British Raj. The state had an area of 1,050 square kilometres (407 sq mi), and a population of 63,702 in 1901. The state, which included the Tons River, consists mainly of alluvial soil covering sandstone, and is fertile except in the hilly district of the south. A large area was forested, and lumber provided a small export trade.

The state was founded in 1778 by Rajput of the Kachwaha clan, who were granted land by the ruler of the nearby state of Orchha. From 1788 to 1790 Maihar State was occupied by Banda. The state became a princely state of British India in the early 19th century, and was administered as part of Bundelkhand Agency in the Central India Agency. In 1871 the eastern states of Bundelkhand Agency, including Maihar, were separated to form the new Bagelkhand Agency in Central India. In 1933 Maihar, along with ten other states in western Bagelkhand, were transferred back to the Bundelkhand Agency.

The state suffered severely from famine in 1896–1897. Maihar became a station on the East Indian Railway (now the West Central Railway) line between Satna and Jabalpur, 156 kilometres (97 mi) north of Jabalpur. Extensive ruins of shrines and other buildings surround the town. As of 1940, it had a population of 79,558 and an area of 412 square miles. In 1948 Maihar was merged into India.

Kothi state

Kothi State was a princely state of the British Raj. It belonged to the Bagelkhand Agency of Central India. Its capital was at Kothi, in modern Satna district of Madhya Pradesh. It was a relatively small Sanad state of about 438 km2 with a population of 19,112 inhabitants in 1901. The state's territory divided neighbouring Sohawal State in two parts. Kothi State was founded at an uncertain date by a Rajput ruler who expelled the former Bharr ruler of the area.

Towards the beginning of the nineteenth century, and in much the same manner as neighboring Sohawal, Kothi became a British protectorate initially subordinate to Panna State. However, a separate sanad was granted to Rais Lal Duniyapati Singh in 1810. The last ruler of Kothi signed the instrument of accession to the Indian Union on 1 January 1950.

Sohawal state
Sohawal State was a princely state of the Bagelkhand Agency of the British Raj. It was a relatively small sanad state of about 552 km2 with a population of 32,216 inhabitants in 1901. Its capital was at Sohawal, a small town —2,108 inhabitants in 1901— located in modern Satna district of Madhya Pradesh.

The state was divided in two sections, separated by territory belonging to Kothi State and, on its northern side, it formed a small enclave within neighbouring Panna State.

Sohawal State was founded in the mid-sixteenth century by a ruler named Fateh Singh. It had originally been much larger, but lost significant territory within the first centuries of its existence.

Sohawal became a British protectorate, initially subordinate to Panna State, but a separate sanad was granted to Rais Aman Singh in 1809. During the 1830 - 1833 interregnum, Sohawal came under direct British administration.[2] The last ruler of Sohawal signed the instrument of accession to the Indian Union on 1 January 1950.

 Chaube Jagirs (five feudatory estates).

Modern history
The Satna District is part of the region of Bagelkhand, a large part of which was ruled by the state of Rewa. A small part of Satna was ruled by feudatory chiefs, holding their states under the British Raj. Satna's name comes from the Satna River (or Sutna) which originates at Sarang Ashram (Sutikshna Ashram), situated near Sarangpur village in the Panna district. Previously, Sutna was the name of the railway station, the town being Raghurajnagar, but gradually the name of the station became associated with the city that is now Satna.

During the Ramayana Era, Lord Rama stayed in the region of Chitrakoot, half of which is in the outskirts of Satna, the other in Uttar Pradesh.

Once a British headquarters, the Baghelkhand Agency was established in Satna in 1872 (and abolished in 1931). Col. D.W.K. Barr prepared plans to develop Satna during the years 1882–88 and Sir Donald Robertson supervised the construction of roads and other amenities according to those plans in 1888–94.

Geography

Climate
Satna has humid subtropical climate (Köppen climate classification Cwa) with hot summers, a somewhat cooler monsoon season and cool winters. Heavy rainfall occurs in the monsoon season from June to September.

Demographics

As of 2011 Indian Census, Satna had a total population of 280,222, of which 147,874 were males and 132,348 were females. Population within the age group of 0 to 6 years was 32,774. The total number of literates in Satna was 209,825, which constituted 74.9% of the population with male literacy of 79.5% and female literacy of 69.7%. The effective literacy rate of 7+ population of Satna was 84.8%, of which male literacy rate was 90.1% and female literacy rate was 78.9%. The Scheduled Castes and Scheduled Tribes population was 38,978 and 9,381 respectively. Satna had 54699 households in 2011.

 India census, Satna had a population of 225,468, of which males 120,203 were males and 105,265 were females. Satna has an average literacy rate of 69.6%, of which male literacy is 76.2%, and female literacy is 62.1%. In Satna, the population in the age groups of 0 to 6 years was 33,205.

Economy
Satna is in the limestone belts of India. As a result, it contributes around 8%–9% of India's total cement production. There is an abundance of dolomite and limestone in the area and the city has ten cement factories producing and exporting cement to other parts of the country. The electrical cable company Universal Cables in Satna is among the pioneers in the country. The city of Satna is known as the commercial capital of Baghelkhand. The city is among the few most promising cities of Madhya Pradesh because of the several new industries planned by some of the reputed industrial houses in the country. The city has witnessed a sharp growth in the post-liberalization era (after 1993). Major problems faced by the city may include, inter alia: inadequate electricity, poor road conditions, and air pollution from atmospheric wastes of cement factories. Satna is known as the cement city of India.

Culture

Satna district has some major religious tourism spots including Chitrakoot and Maihar. Satna district is close to an ancient city of Buddhist culture named Bharhut, whose archaeological remains are displayed in many museums in India and all over the world. Tulsi Museum at Ramvan, 16 km from the city, has many local artistic sculptures of ancient times. Gaibinath Shiva temple at Birsinghpur is a famous and old temple in the region. Madhavgarh Fort, about 7 km from Satna Railway station (Rewa Road), is another place to visit around Satna. Gidhakoot (Gidhaila) Parvat, Laxminarayan Mandir, Bada Mandir (under construction) of New Deorajnagar are also tourist sites.

Satna is famous for its scenic temples. One of those temples, Venktesh Mandir, is near Mukhtyarganj. It was constructed between 1876 and 1925 by the royal family of Deorajnagar. Shri Bihari Mandir, in the heart of Satna. It was built by a great devotee of God Krishna, Mahant Brindavan Das, in the 1880s. Bihari Mandir has been a cultural center of Satna for over one hundred years as it organizes a very famous Ramleela which is revered by the locals. The 116th celebration to place in 2013. Dali Baba is a very ancient place of worship in Satna. It is said to have been established in 1857 by Abdaldas Baba. A Jain temple was constructed in 1880 and another Jain temple of Lord Shantinath in Somchand-Dharsi Ghar-derasar near 1889 and Pranami Mandir in 1890. Satyanarayan Temple is more than 450 years old.

Transport

Roadways

Bus services connect Satna with various cities of Madhya Pradesh and some cities of Uttar Pradesh. The city is well-connected by state highways and a national highway. Satna is connected to the longest National Highway: NH-7. State highway NH-75 passes from the heart of Satna and connects it to cities of Panna and Rewa, which are other important cities of northern Madhya Pradesh.

Urban transport
Satna City Transport Services Ltd (SCTSL) operates buses in the city. The buses designated as City Bus operate on four routes in the city. The buses are color-coded into two colors: Orange (Intracity) and Green (Intercity) according to their routes.

Railways

Satna Junction railway station (IRCTC code STA) is a major railway station in the Western-Central railway division on the route between Jabalpur Junction and Allahabad. It is a junction and the branch goes to Rewa. It lies on the Howrah–Allahabad–Mumbai line, a train route connecting Mumbai and Howrah. A diesel Locoshed for the Western Central Railway is located in the city. Distance from Satna to Jabalpur Junction is approximate 200 kilometres and Allahabad is approximate 186 kilometres

Airways
Satna has an airport named Bharhut Airport, built in 1970. Closest major airport is in Allahabad in Uttar Pradesh, which is approximately 192 kilometers from Satna. The nearest major airport to Satna in the state is Jabalpur Airport which is approximately 200 kilometres from the city. Another airport is Khajuraho airport (HJR) which is approximately 112-kilometre from city.

Education

Satna has a literacy rate of 63.8% according to the 2011 Census;. India's first, little known, rural university in Chitrakoot Mahatma Gandhi Chitrakoot Gramoday Vishwavidyalaya was established in 1991. It is one of sixteen state government universities in Madhya Pradesh. AKS University is a private university established in 2011 in the city.

Notable people
 J. S. Verma, former Chief Justice of India
 Gulsher Ahmed, former governor, Himachal Pradesh
 Shivanand, former speaker, Vindhya Pradesh Legislative Assembly
 Govind Narayan Singh, former chief minister, Madhya Pradesh
 Arjun Singh, former chief minister, Madhya Pradesh
 Sharat Saxena, actor
 Raj Jain, professor at Washington University

See also
 Satna (Lok Sabha constituency)
 Betul

References

External links

 
 

 
Cities and towns in Satna district
Cities in Madhya Pradesh